Yinka Olukunga , also known as Nnenna, is a Nigerian actress, kiddies show producer, and host.

Career
A Lagos State University graduate, she is best known for her numerous children's TV productions for Wale Adenuga Productions. She has said of her career: "Working with children makes me happy. I share a special bond with them and it brightens my day to see them smile". She was awarded Lagos State University (LASU) Ambassador Award.

Personal life
She got married in 2014 and gave birth to twin girls Olivia and Maia on 18 September 2015.

See also 

 List of Nigerian actresses

References

Living people
Lagos State University alumni
Yoruba actresses
21st-century Nigerian actresses
Year of birth missing (living people)
20th-century births
Nigerian film actresses
Nigerian television producers
Nigerian television presenters